Neve Tirtza Prison (Hebrew: בית סוהר נווה תרצה) is Israel's only women's prison. 

Neve Tirtza opened in 1968. It is one of several prisons located in Ramla and is directly adjacent to Maasiyahu Prison. In 2019, there were 200 women incarcerated at Neve Tirtza.

See also
Incarceration of women
Israeli Prison Service

References

External links

Prisons in Israel
Buildings and structures in Ramla
Buildings and structures in Central District (Israel)
 Women's prisons